The Center for Nanotechnology is one of the first centers for nanotechnology. It is located in Münster, North Rhine-Westphalia, Germany. It offers many possibilities for research, education, start-ups and companies in nanotechnology. Hence it works together with the University of Münster (WWU), the Max Planck Institute for Molecular Biomedicine and many more research institutions.

External links
 CeNTech Homepage

Nanotechnology institutions
Münster
Research institutes in Germany
University of Münster